Gunehgar Kaun (Hindi: गुनहगार कौन) is a 1991 Bollywood drama film directed by Ashok Gaikwad starring Raj Babbar, Sujata Mehta, Mohsin Khan and Sangeeta Bijlani in lead roles. The music was composed by R. D. Burman.

Cast
 Raj Babbar as Vinod Saxena
 Sujata Mehta as Madhu Saxena
 Mohsin Khan as Inspector Ravi Kumar
 Sangeeta Bijlani as Nisha
 Paresh Rawal as Jagira
 Saeed Jaffrey as Rai Bahadur Diwan

Soundtrack
The score is composed by R. D. Burman, while all the songs are written by Majrooh Sultanpuri.

External links

References

1991 films
1990s Hindi-language films
Films scored by R. D. Burman
Indian action drama films